The Serbian Football Championship season of 1921–22 was the third championship organised by the Serbian Football Federation (Srpski loptački savez). Played among the clubs from the territory of the cities of Belgrade and Novi Sad, the league served as inspiration and test for the Yugoslav Football Championship that would be created in 1923.

First League (1. Razred)

External links
 League table at RSSSF

Serbian Football Championship
Serbia
Serbia
Football
Football